Puthiya Kovilakam Ettanunni Raja (14 August 1910 - 16  August 2003) was the Zamorin of Calicut (hereditary monarch) from 19 January 1998 to 16 August 2003.

Early life 
Ettanunni Raja was born on 14 August 1910 to Vamanan Namboothiri and Aniyathi Thampuratti. He studied at Srikrishna Vidyalayam and worked as a school teacher, clerk and cashier at different times. Etanunni Raja was also a respected Sanskrit scholar.

Reign 
Etanunni Raja became Zamorin on 19 January 1998 on the death of his predecessor P. K. Kuttianujan Raja.

Death 
Etanunni Raja died at a private hospital on 16 August 2003. He was succeeded as Zamorin by P. K. S. Raja.

1910 births
2003 deaths
20th-century Indian monarchs